In enzymology, a glutathione gamma-glutamylcysteinyltransferase is an enzyme that catalyzes the chemical reaction

glutathione + [Glu(-Cys)]n-Gly  Gly + [Glu(-Cys)]n+1-Gly

Thus, the two substrates of this enzyme are glutathione and [Glu(-Cys)]n-Gly, whereas its two products are Gly and [Glu(-Cys)]n+1-Gly.

This enzyme belongs to the family of transferases, specifically the aminoacyltransferases.  The systematic name of this enzyme class is glutathione:poly(4-glutamyl-cysteinyl)glycine 4-glutamylcysteinyltransferase. Other names in common use include phytochelatin synthase, and gamma-glutamylcysteine dipeptidyl transpeptidase.

Structural studies

References

 

EC 2.3.2
Enzymes of known structure